The Luck of Ginger Coffey, a novel by Northern Irish-Canadian writer Brian Moore, was published in 1960, in the United States by The Atlantic Monthly and in the United Kingdom by Andre Deutsch. In Canada, it received a Governor General's Award. The book was made into a film, directed by Irvin Kershner, and released in 1964. Robert Shaw starred in the title role.

Plot 
Encyclopaedia Britannica describes The Luck of Ginger Coffey as being about an "Irish-born Canadian immigrant whose self-deluded irresponsible behaviour nearly breaks up his family".

The book's protagonist, James Francis Coffey, is called "Ginger" because of his reddish hair and moustache. He is unfulfilled in his career, no matter which job he takes. After his release from the Army, he and his wife, Veronica, together with their daughter Paulie, move to Montreal.

In Canada, Coffey still has trouble finding work. Veronica gets very upset when she finds out that Ginger is still unemployed and has spent their ticket money home.

However broke and empty-hearted they may be, they do have one friend to count on in Canada: Gerry Grosvenor, who helps Coffey get a job working as a proofreader at a newspaper. Coffey is unimpressed once again and continues to tell Veronica it will all get better, but Veronica has her own plans for improving her life in Canada. She leaves Coffey for Grosvenor and takes Paulie with her. She also takes all of Coffey's money and most of his belongings. Coffey gets a small place at the YMCA, and during his stay there he encounters a man who offers him a diaper delivery and pick-up job.

Coffey finds this job even more repulsive than his current one but takes it anyway, with a plan in mind: To get back at Paulie and impress Veronica with his selflessness. Veronica is still unconvinced, but Paulie turns to her father's side and they get a flat of their own. Coffey is obsessed with Veronica and begins to get sick from lack of sleep and food and an excessive work schedule. He is also obsessed with being promoted to reporter so that Veronica will take him back, but unfortunately she only brings up the topic of divorce. After many drunk excursions, fist fights with Gerry, a run-in with the police and promotion battles, Veronica finally sees how hard Ginger is working and fighting for her, and at the moment when he finally decides to let her go she sees just how much he really loves her.

Quotation
“Love – why, I'll tell you what love is: it's you at 75 and her at 71, each of you listening for the other's step in the next room, each afraid that a sudden silence, a sudden cry, could mean a lifetime's talk is over.” 
― Brian Moore, The Luck of Ginger Coffey

Reception
When the book was published in 1960, Kirkus Reviews described Coffey as a "somewhat jauntier figure" than the protagonists in Moore's previous two books. "If Ginger has learned to compromise, so too has Brian Moore, and this third book, with its tempered finale, is less devastating than the earlier ones."

References

External links
 da Cruz, Patricia Lane Goncalves (2008). Brian Moore's "The Luck of Ginger Coffey": an experience of immigration from Ireland to Canada in the fifties. Universidade Federal de Minas Gerais. Retrieved 2 October 2021.
 Lynch, Gerald (23 December 2016). "Brian Moore’s Unsettling Irish Immigrant: The Luck of Ginger Coffey", University of Toronto Press. Retrieved 2 October 2021.
"The Luck of Ginger Coffey: Themes and Meanings". enotes. 8 May 2015. Retrieved 2 October 2021.

1960 British novels
1960 Canadian novels
André Deutsch books
Canadian novels adapted into films
Governor General's Award-winning fiction books
Irish novels adapted into films
New Canadian Library
Novels by Brian Moore (novelist)
Novels set in Montreal